This is a list of shipwrecks located in or off the coast of Canada.

British Columbia

Manitoba

New Brunswick

Newfoundland and Labrador

Northwest Territories

Nova Scotia

Nunavut

Ontario

Prince Edward Island

Quebec

Saskatchewan

Yukon

See also 
List of shipwrecks in the Great Lakes

References

External links

 
Canada
Canada transport-related lists